Article 14 of the European Convention on Human Rights lists the prohibited grounds against which discrimination in illegal. The text states that"The enjoyment of the rights and freedoms set forth in [the] Convention shall be secured without discrimination on any ground such as sex, race, colour, language, religion, political or other opinion, national or social origin, association with a national minority, property, birth or other status."Unlike the Universal Declaration of Human Rights, there is no general right to equal treatment, only in the areas covered by the Convention. However, the article covers an open-ended list of prohibited grounds for discrimination and has been expanded over time to include such grounds as sexual orientation. In the case law of the European Court of Human Rights, the interpretation of the article has expanded over time to include indirect discrimination. Protocol 12 to the European Convention on Human Rights expands on Article 14 to include a freestanding prohibition of discrimination in "any right set forth by law". Introduced in 2000, it has been ratified by 20 of 47 Council of Europe states .

In early cases before the European Court of Human Rights the court assumed that for Article 14 to be relevant, a breach of one of the substantive Convention rights had to have occurred. If the court did find a substantive breach, it would not find it necessary to consider Article 14. In the Belgian Linguistic case in 1968, the Belgian government argued that Article 14 was not relevant unless there was a substantive breach. For the first time, the court rejected this argument. Following this case, the court considers that for Article 14 to be considered "it suffices that the facts of a case fall within the ambit of another substantive provision of the Convention or its Protocols". 

The court focuses on substantive equality rather than formal equality, and therefore it considers affirmative action acceptable in certain circumstances. According to the court's case law, any difference in treatment based on fixed status must be proportional to the justified aims pursued and the margin of appreciation has especially narrowed with regard to different treatment based exclusively on ethnic origin, gender, sexual orientation, or disability. For example, in the 2013 case Vallianatos and Others v. Greece a registered partnership scheme that only recognized different-sex couples was ruled to be a violation of Article 14 because it discriminated against same-sex couples.

References

Further reading

External links
Official case law guide for Article 14

14
Discrimination in Europe
Anti-discrimination law